Love and Fear (also known as Three Sisters; ,) is a 1988 drama film directed by Margarethe von Trotta. It was entered into the 1988 Cannes Film Festival.

Cast
 Fanny Ardant as Velia
 Greta Scacchi as Maria
 Valeria Golino as Sandra Parini
 Peter Simonischek as Massimo
 Sergio Castellitto as Roberto
 Agnès Soral as Sabrina
 Jan Biczycki as Cecchini
 Paolo Hendel as Federico
 Ralph Schicha as Nicole
 Gila von Weitershausen as Erika
 Giampiero Bianchi as Giacomo
 Giovanni Colombo as Marco
 Guido Alberti as Baretti
 Beniamino Placido as Savagnoni

References

External links

1988 films
1988 drama films
Italian drama films
French drama films
German drama films
West German films
1980s Italian-language films
1980s German-language films
Films set in Italy
Films based on Three Sisters
Films directed by Margarethe von Trotta
1980s German films
1980s Italian films
1980s French films